Liu Wenhui (1895 – 24 June 1976) was a Chinese general and warlord of Sichuan province (Sichuan clique). At the beginning of his career, he was aligned with the Kuomintang (KMT), commanding the Sichuan-Xikang Defence Force from 1927 to 1929. The western part of Sichuan province was then known as Xikang. Bordering Tibet, the region had a mixed population of Tibetans and Han Chinese.

In 1949 he defected to the Communist forces of Mao Zedong, and went on to hold high office in the new People's Republic of China, serving as Minister of Forestry (1959–1967), member of the National People's Congress, member of the National Committee of the Chinese People's Political Consultative Conference, and member of the Central Committee of the Revolutionary Committee of the Chinese Kuomintang.

Military career and Republic of China
Liu Wenhui was born in 1895 in Dayi County, Sichuan, and studied at the Baoding Military Academy, graduating in 1916.

After graduating in 1916, Liu Wenhui returned to Sichuan and served as a staff officer under warlord Liu Cunhou of the Sichuan Army. In November 1926, he joined the Kuomintang and was appointed as the commander of the 24th Army of the National Revolutionary Army.

Liu was then made Governor of Sichuan in 1929, but his relationship with Chiang Kai-shek was unstable, as was the province he governed. Sichuan was in the hands of Liu and four other warlords: Liu Xiang, Yang Sen, Deng Xihou, and Tian Songyao. No one warlord had enough power to take on all the others at once, so many small battles occurred, pitting one warlord against another. Large conflicts seldom developed, plotting and skirmishing characterized the Sichuanese political scene, and ephemeral coalitions and counter coalitions emerged and vanished with equal rapidity.

In May 1930 his province was invaded by the army of Tibet. With the province locked in internal struggles, no reinforcements were sent to support the Sichuan troops stationed in Xikang. As a result, the Tibetan army captured, without encountering much resistance, Garze and Xinlong (Zhanhua). When a negotiated ceasefire failed, Tibet expanded the war attempting to capture parts of southern Qinghai province. In March 1932 their force invaded Qinghai but was defeated. In 1932 Liu, in cooperation with the Qinghai army (Ma clique), sent out a brigade to attack the Tibetan troops in Garze and Xinlong, eventually re-occupying them, and all territories east of the Jinsha River.

In 1932, during the Sino-Tibetan War, Liu drove the Tibetans back to the Yangtze River and even threatened to attack Chamdo.

Liu Wenhui had a rivalry with his nephew, General Liu Xiang. Finally Liu was ousted from Chengdu by Liu Xiang in 1935, when Liu Xiang sided with smaller warlords against Liu. A family-brokered peace was arranged, and Liu was given control of the neighbouring Xikang province.

During the fight with Communist forces while the Long March was in process, Chiang Kai-shek repeatedly ordered Liu to bring his troops against the Communists, but Liu made excuses, while secretly allowing safe passage for the Chinese Red Army in a non-aggression pact. Thus the engagements around Xiakou Village in 1934 did not involve Liu's 24th Route Army, but the 21st army of GMD troops garrisoned just across the Sichuan border in Mingshan.

In 1936 Liu Wenhui's ties with Chiang soured even further due to his independent policy, but Chiang was not powerful enough to do anything meaningful against him at the time.

From 1939 on, as Governor of Xikang Province Liu tried to establish the infrastructure needed to support the remote province. Its transport was primitive and it had no industry to speak of. Large projects such as the hydroelectric plant built in 1944 promised to bring the area into the modern world. Liu also promoted education as a way to improve Xikang’s situation.

Liu walked the tightrope of allegiance throughout the 1940s. He made sure that his forces saw as little action as possible, while at the same time he was careful not to arouse the full wrath of Chiang Kai-shek, and thereby continued to reap the benefits of wearing the Nationalist mantle.

Liu switched sides from his half-hearted alignment with the Kuomintang to fully siding with the Communists of Mao Zedong on December 9, 1949, during the Chengdu Uprising (Chengdu was the last important/major city on the Chinese mainland to fall under Communist control).

People's Republic of China
Mao Zedong appointed Liu to the Southwest China Military and Political Committee, where he served until 1954. He was also elected a member of the National Committee of the Chinese People's Political Consultative Conference and a member of the National People's Congress, and was also appointed to the Central Military Commission.

Politically, he joined the Revolutionary Committee of the Chinese Kuomintang, becoming a member of its Central Committee, and served as Minister of Forestry from 1959 to 1967.

On June 24, 1976, Liu Wenhui died in Beijing. He was 81 years old.

References

External links
Liu_Wen-hui
A Vanished Province
The Tibetan Army's Second Eastward Invasion
Landscape and Power in a Sichuan Mountain Village
Generals from China

History of Sichuan
1895 births
1976 deaths
Republic of China warlords from Sichuan
National Revolutionary Army generals from Sichuan
Politicians from Chengdu
Members of the Kuomintang
People's Republic of China politicians from Sichuan
Governors of Sichuan